

Øyvind Strømmen is a Norwegian author, translator and freelance journalist. He is known for his books on rightwing extremism and many contributions in Norwegian social- and mainstream media.

After the dual terrorist attacks in Norway on 22 July 2011, his insights and his book have been used in mainstream media to explain the violent potential in some of the ideologies and conspiracy theories utilized by the far-right, anti-Islamic groups in Europe. His 2011 book Det mørke nettet (the dark network) was praised by a reviewer for NRK as "an important contribution to understanding radical right movements, ideologies and actors in Norway and in Europe".

, Strømmen is in the process of establishing a journalistic network together with journalist Kjetil Stormark which will focus on extreme movements, hate speech and hate crime in Europe, the Middle East and North Africa. The project, which is named Hate Speech International, intends to set up a website and is economically supported by the Norwegian Ministry of Foreign Affairs and the free speech organization Fritt Ord. He is a regular contributor to Minerva, and in June 2013 publicly posed a set of questions to the anti-Islamic blogger known as Fjordman, who had criticised the funding in Aftenposten.

Strømmen was named Freelance Journalist of the Year in Norway in 2011 by the freelance journalists in the Norwegian Union of Journalists.

Strømmen is politically active in the Green Party.

Books
 Eurofascism, 2008, Lulu.com  (English)
 Det mørke nettet. om høyreekstremisme, kontrajihadisme og terror i Europa, 2011, Cappelen Damm,  (Norwegian Bokmål)
 Den sorte tråden. Europeisk høyreradikalisme fra 1920 til i dag, Cappelen Damm,  (Norwegian Bokmål)

As co-author 
Sigve Indregaard (editor): Motgift. Akademisk respons på den nye høyreekstremismen. Flamme and Manifest Forlag. (Norwegian Bokmål)

See also
Eurabia
Fjordman

References

External links
 Øyvind Strømmens betraktninger (blog) 

Norwegian bloggers
Living people
Norwegian political writers
Year of birth missing (living people)